Bernhard Paumgartner (born 14 November 1887 in Vienna; died 27 July 1971 in Salzburg) was an Austrian conductor, composer and musicologist. He is most famous for being Herbert von Karajan's composition teacher at the Mozarteum in Salzburg, where he recognized his pupil's potential gifts for conducting. Karajan would become a notable conductor. He also taught Vittorio Negri.

Works
Das Taghorn - Works of minnesingers (1922)
Mozart - Biography (1927)
Franz Schubert. Eine Biographie - Biography (1943). Published in Spain by Alianza Editorial, SA, in 1992, under the title Franz Schubert.
Bach - Biography (1950)
Mozart - Biography (1957). Published in Spain by Alianza Editorial, SA, in 1991.
Das von der Antike Instrumentelle Ensemble bis zur Gegenwart (1966)

Decorations and awards
 Honorary title of privy councillor
 Honorary doctorate from the Faculty of Philosophy, University of Salzburg (14 November 1967)
 Austrian Decoration for Science and Art (1962)
 Honorary Citizen of the City of Salzburg (1963)
 Ring of Salzburg (1963)
 Naming of Bernhard-Paumgartner-Weg in Salzburg

References

1887 births
1971 deaths
Musicians from Vienna
Male conductors (music)
Austrian male writers
Mozart scholars
Academic staff of Mozarteum University Salzburg
Recipients of the Austrian Decoration for Science and Art
20th-century Austrian musicologists
Academic staff of the University of Music and Performing Arts Vienna
20th-century Austrian conductors (music)
20th-century Austrian male musicians